Jean "Johny" Fonck (November 30, 1920 – July 17, 2008) was a Luxembourgian athlete who competed at the 1952 Summer Olympics in Helsinki. Competing in two events, he failed to advance beyond the first round in either the 110 or 400 metres hurdles events. He also played football as a midfielder, and appeared one time for the Luxembourg national team in 1940. He later worked as a manager. In July 2008 he was promoted to the rank of Chevalier in the Order of Merit of the Grand Duchy of Luxembourg and died later that month at the age of 87.

References

1920 births
2008 deaths
Sportspeople from Luxembourg City
Luxembourgian male hurdlers
Olympic athletes of Luxembourg
Athletes (track and field) at the 1952 Summer Olympics
Knights of the Order of Merit of the Grand Duchy of Luxembourg
Luxembourgian footballers
Luxembourg international footballers
Association football midfielders
Luxembourgian football managers